Vili Helu (born 20 March 1996) is an American rugby union player, currently playing for . His preferred position is flanker or number 8.

Early career
Helu is from Alamo, California and was selected for Team USA for the Youth Olympic Games. He attended Saint Mary's College of California where he achieved All-American honours.

Professional career
Helu signed for Rugby ATL in 2019 ahead of the 2020 Major League Rugby season. He has remained with the team since.

Helu toured with the USA Falcons XV side to South Africa in 2022. He made his debut for the full United States side in 2022, making his debut against Kenya.

References

External links
itsrugby.co.uk Profile

1996 births
Living people
American rugby union players
United States international rugby union players
Rugby union flankers
Rugby union number eights
Rugby ATL players